Ramón Jacinto Herrera (1928–2007), known as Ray Tico, was a musician from Costa Rica. Considered an icon of popular Costa Rican music, he has been the only foreigner to be part of the cuban filin movement. Singer and guitarist , he wrote popular songs such as Romance  en La Habana,  Eso es imposible, México de luz y  color,  el bolero Dominicana, Me  quedo callado, Dialoguemos, Solo para recordar.

Biography 
Ramon Jacinto Herrera, alias Ray Tico, was born in Limón, Costa Rica in 1928. He received his first guitar when he was 7 years old, and he never let go since. When he was a teenager he left for Colombia as a fisherman, and it is there that he began his career as a musician, which continued for the rest of his life.

Musical career 
In 1953, he went to Cuba where he adopted the nickname Ray Tico, as well as composing "Eso es Imposible" ("That is Impossible"), his biggest hit among the more than 50 other songs that he wrote. His unique style of guitar playing, that also includes using it as a percussion instrument, became his personal stamp of distinction. With his new fame, Ray moved to the U.S., frequently playing at the Waldorf Astoria New York. Later in Hollywood, he gained fame as a latin playboy, often invited to join the most famous people of the era like Frank Sinatra, Nat King Cole, and Sammy Davis Jr.
In 1969, at the age of 41, after having passed on the music and culture of Costa Rica throughout the world, Ray returned to Costa Rica to stay. He spent the next 38 years writing songs and playing in virtually every important event that occurred in the country, including presidential inaugurations.

Personal life 
Ray Tico married Juanita Pagán on 1957 in Puerto Rico. From that marriage they had two children: Ramón Ricaurte Herrera Pagán and Agosto Herrera Pagán, both from Puerto Rico.

Death 
In August 2007, Ray Tico left on another trip, this time forever. His 79 years were lived intensely. Only weeks before his death, Papaya Music celebrated 8 decades of Ray, where despite his failing health, he got up on stage with Editus and other notable Costa Rican musicians to celebrate his career. Costa Rican will miss Ray, but will remember him with happiness, which, in the end, is what he has given to others all his life.

References

1928 births
2007 deaths
People from Limón Province
Costa Rican guitarists
20th-century guitarists
Costa Rican expatriates in Colombia
Costa Rican expatriates in Cuba
Costa Rican expatriates in the United States